Austen Tayshus (born 17 March 1954) is the stage name of American-born Jewish Australian comedian Alexander Jacob Gutman (commonly called Sandy Gutman). He is best known for the 1983 comedy single "Australiana", a spoken word piece which is filled with Australian puns. 

His humor often draws on his Jewish background. A tall man, he appears on stage wearing a black suit and dark sunglasses. He is characterized by a resonant deep voice. He is often moody, and renowned for taunting his audience and venue staff.

Biography

Early life
Alexander (Sandy) Jacob Gutman was born in New York to Polish Jewish parents and moved to Sydney at the age of one. He is the son of a Hasidic Holocaust survivor. He grew up in an Orthodox Jewish home. At 15, he participated in the International Bible Contest for Jewish Youth in Australia and won, and then took part in the finals in Israel, where  he finished in the top 10. Later, he spent several months at a yeshiva in Jerusalem. He returned to Israel as a volunteer during the Yom Kippur War. Gutman attended Vaucluse Boys' High School from 1966 to 1971.

He received a Commonwealth Scholarship to Sydney University in 1972, where he began a dentistry degree. After two years he lost interest in dentistry and changed to an arts degree, and subsequently to a film directing course at The Australian Film and Television School, graduating as a film director in 1978. He wrote and directed three short comedies while at film school, Eric and Alice in 1975, Waves in 1976 and The End in 1977.

After graduation from the AFTRS, he worked at ABC Television as an assistant cameraman in their Cinecamera department. From 1979 to 1980 he freelanced as a camera assistant and cinematographer on film clips for Aussie bands including Cold Chisel, The Angels, and Mental as Anything.

Gutman lives in Sydney, New South Wales and has two adult daughters.

1981–1984: "Australiana", "Phantom Shuffle" & When the Ticklers Stopped Quivering
His stand-up comedy career began at Sydney's Comedy Store at the beginning of 1981. The stage name "Austen Tayshus" is an aptronym based on the word "ostentatious".

He first gained public recognition in 1983 when he signed to Regular Records who released his comedy single, "Australiana". It is a spoken word piece that contains many puns using Australian terms, especially the names of places and animals. For example:"...my mate Boomer rang" (boomerang)
"...do you wanna game of Euchre, Lyptus?" (eucalyptus)
"...how much can a koala bear?" (koala)

"Australiana" is the biggest selling Australian 12 inch single ever. It was number one on the charts in 1983 for 13 weeks.

In 1984, Tayshus released the single "Phantom Shuffle", which rose to number 16 nationally on the Aria Chart, followed by his debut album When the Ticklers Stopped Quivering, which also peaked within The Australian top 100.

In 1984, he sold out the Sydney Entertainment Centre, supported by local comedians.

1985–1989: "Highway Corroboree" & Whispering Joke
In February 1988, Tayshus released the single "Highway Corroboree", which peaked at number 46 on the Australian charts. It was lifted from the album Whispering Joke. He performed the single live on the Sunday Program in 1988, on Channel Nine, especially for the Australian bicentennial anniversary. His controversial monologue sided with the Aboriginal people, and was highly critical of the first white settlers.

In the late 1980s Tayshus toured Australia with other well-known comedians. He often introduced young and gifted new comics to his audiences.

1990s: Film
In 1990 Tayshus relocated to Los Angeles to pursue a movie career. He had a small cameo in the Sharon Stone movie Sliver, directed by mate and fellow film school alumnus Phillip Noyce.

At night, Tayshus worked in comedy clubs in LA and in New York. He was represented for stand-up by Irvin Arthur and Associates in LA in 1993 and for film work by Metropolitain. He auditioned for movies including Ace Ventura Pet Detective and Clear and Present Danger

His stay in Los Angeles culminated in a collaboration on a low-budget feature film titled Dream Factory, which he co-wrote with the Director Paschal Franchot, and was lead actor. The film was a tragi-comedy about Austen's last days in LA trying to become a big shot. It also included cameos from Naomi Watts, Billy Zane, and Nehemiah Persoff.

Returning to Australia in 1997, Tayshus wrote and starred in a short film titled Intolerance. At Tropfest in 1998, the film won the award for Best Film, and Tayshus won Best Actor. The film had been entered in competition under the name of a fictitious feminist filmmaker, Laura Feinstein. When the film won, the head of Tropfest, John Polson, announced that the top prize had finally been won by a woman. When the director, Paul Fenech, jumped up to claim the award, to everyone's surprise, saying there was no Laura Feinstein, it created great controversy.

The Tropfest win led directly to work on the Jane Campion film Holy Smoke!, Emma-Kate Croghan's Strange Planet and Baz Luhrmann's Moulin Rouge!.

In 1999, Tayshus participated in the television series Aussie Jokers, produced and directed by Paul Fenech for SBS TV. His segment was an historical journey about his father's Holocaust experiences in Poland, from his hometown of Łódź, to the death camp Treblinka, to his rescue from Bergen Belsen. It is an emotional and deeply moving double header tracing Isaac Gutman's life from 1939 to 1945, when most of his family was murdered by the Germans just for being Jewish. The documentary has been shown several times on SBS and is available on YouTube.

A documentary about Austen Tayshus, produced by Angry Messiah Pictures and titled Austen Tayshus Skin in the Game, was completed in 2020 and scheduled for release on Foxdocos Channel on July 17, 2022.

1999–2009: "Footyana"
In July 2000, Tayshus released "Footyana", a comedy piece in the style of "Australiana", referring to Australian rules football and the National Rugby League. It includes such lines as:"Are Steve and Tin gay or something?" (Stephen Tingay)
"We passed Liam the Burger Rings. Come on Liam, pick a ring." (Liam Pickering)

He performed it live on the television show Live and Kicking to great acclaim.

He continued to tour Australia, performing one hundred shows a year.

2010: Political career
In August 2010, Tayshus ran for the Australian House of Representatives in the Division of Warringah in the August federal election, representing the Australian Sex Party. He stood against Liberal Party leader Tony Abbott. He subsequently ran in the 2011 New South Wales state election as a member of the Outdoor Recreation Party, contesting Opposition Leader Barry O'Farrell's seat of Ku-ring-gai.

In 2012, Tayshus appeared as a panelist on the ABC's political panel show Q&A to promote the release of his biography, Austen Tayshus: Merchant of Menace, written by Richard Murphy and Ross Fitzgerald.

Discography
Studio albums

Live albums

Singles

Awards and nominations
Countdown Australia Music Awards
The Countdown Australia Music Awards were an awards ceremony produced by Countdown in collaboration with the Australian Recording Industry Association (ARIA), from 1981 to 1986. 

|-
| rowspan="2"| 1983
| "Australiana"
| Best Debut Single
| 
|-
| himself
| Special Achievement
| 
|-
| 1984
| "Phantom Shuffle"
| Best Male Performance in a Video
| 
|-

ARIA Music Awards
The ARIA Music Awards is an annual awards ceremony that commenced in 1987 and recognises excellence, innovation, and achievement across all genres of Australian music. Austen Tayshus has been nominated for four awards.

|-
| 1987
| Do the Pope| rowspan="4"| Best Comedy Release
| 
|-
| 1989
| "Highway Corroboree"
| 
|-
| 1995
| Alive and Schticking''
| 
|-
| 1996
| "I'm Jacques Chirac"
| 
|-

Literature

References

External links 

1954 births
Living people
20th-century American Jews
Australian Jews
American people of Polish-Jewish descent
Australian people of Polish-Jewish descent
Jewish Australian comedians
American stand-up comedians
Australian stand-up comedians
People from New York (state)
People from Sydney
Australian Sex Party politicians
American emigrants to Australia
21st-century American Jews